Karl David Wilhelm Busch (5 January 1826 in Marburg – 24 November 1881 in Bonn) was a German surgeon.

Biography
He was born in Marburg, and studied at the University of Berlin, where he was a student of Johannes Peter Müller and Bernhard von Langenbeck. He received his doctorate in 1848. In 1855, he was appointed professor of surgery at Bonn, and afterwards acted as consulting surgeon general in the army in 1866 and during the Franco-Prussian War. In 1867 he became director of the Surgical Clinic of the University of Bonn, the world's first in cancer immunotherapy. Among his students at Bonn was dermatologist Joseph Doutrelepont.

Works
 Chirurgische Beobachtungen, gesammelt in der Klinik zu Berlin (Surgical observations gathered in the clinic at Berlin; 1854).
 Lehrbuch der Chirurgie (Textbook of surgery; 2 vols., 1857–69).

References

1826 births
1881 deaths
Humboldt University of Berlin alumni
Academic staff of the University of Bonn
German surgeons